Identification Parade is the first studio album by indietronica band The Octopus Project. It was released April 16, 2002 on Peek-A-Boo Records.

Track listing
 "What They Found" – 3:04
 "Rorol" – 4:55
 "The Way Things Go" – 7:02   
 "Righteous Ape and Bird" – 4:56 
 "Marshall Examines His Carcass" – 3:03  
 "Its Caption Was a Star" – 4:13  
 "Crying at the Aquarium" – 5:55   
 "Porno Disaster" – 2:29     
 "Hypnopaedia" – 8:18

Notes
 "Its Caption Was a Star", "Righteous Ape & Bird" and "Hypnopaedia" were originally on the Christmas on Mars - EP
 "What They Found" has a music video.

References

External links
Peek-A-Boo Records album site

2002 debut albums
The Octopus Project albums
Peek-A-Boo Records albums